Calyptrocarya is a genus of flowering plants belonging to the family Cyperaceae.

Its native range is Tropical America.

Species:

Calyptrocarya bicolor 
Calyptrocarya delascioi 
Calyptrocarya glomerulata 
Calyptrocarya irwiniana 
Calyptrocarya luzuliformis 
Calyptrocarya monocephala 
Calyptrocarya montesii 
Calyptrocarya poeppigiana

References

Cyperaceae
Cyperaceae genera